The Barrow Gang was an American gang active between 1932 and 1934. They were well known outlaws, robbers, murderers and criminals who as a gang traveled the Central United States during the Great Depression. Their exploits were known all over the nation. They captured the attention of the American press and its readership during what is sometimes referred to as the 'public enemy era'. Though the gang was notorious for the bank robberies they committed, they preferred to rob small stores or gas stations over banks. The gang was believed to have killed at least nine police officers, among several other murders.

The gang was best known for two of its members, Bonnie Parker and Clyde Barrow, an unmarried couple. Clyde Barrow was the leader. Other members included:
 Clyde's older brother Marvin "Buck" Barrow
 Buck Barrow's wife Blanche Barrow
 W. D. Jones
 Henry Methvin
 Raymond Hamilton
 Joe Palmer
 Ralph Fults

Gallery

See also 
 Public enemy

References

 
Organized crime groups in the United States
Prohibition gangs
Depression-era gangsters